Roberto Cueva del Río (April 28, 1908 – June 24, 1988), born as Rodolfo Roberto De La Cueva Del Río, was a very active Mexican muralist. He was given a number of commissions by Lázaro Cárdenas for works in Michoacan, including Pátzcuaro and Cárdenas's birthplace of Jiquilpan. He received other commissions for works in

When he was 6, he and his family moved to Mexico City where went to elementary school. In 1923 he worked with Ernesto García Cabral who was a political cartoonist for the "Excélsior"  newspaper.

From 1924 to 1928 he attended Escuela Nacional de Bellas Artes de la Universidad Nacional & Academy of San Carlos.  His teachers were Germán Gedovious, Sóstenes Ortega, Raziel Cabildo.  The dean Alfonso Pruneda granted a monthly scholarship support ($40), to foment his studies in Fine Arts academy. With this scholarship and his work selling he became a drawing & painting teacher for some Mexican states, teaching in rural schools as a cultural mission.

In 1926 painted his first murals in elementary schools from the Ministry of Public Education of Mexico.

In 1928 he had his first exposition with drawings and political-cartoons.

In 1930  Diego Rivera, then director of the Fine Arts School (Escuela Nacional de Bellas Artes) gave him a letter of recommendation for the governor of the Mexican State of Puebla Leonidas Andrew Almazán who in turned supported his proposal to travel to the United States.   Howard S. Phillips, "Mexican Life Magazine" editor sent a note to Anita Brenner, in which he praised Cueva's work and thinks is a great opportunity so he can get fame and fortune in United States as many painters does.

In 1930 painted new murals in Cuernavaca, Morelos, Mexico, with typical folkloric themes.

In 1931, in New York City he was invited to exhibit his work in Delphic Studios Gallery, owned by Alma Reed. His art got excellent comments from U.S. critics, and received attention from José Juan Tablada, who may have been instrumental in getting him the commission to paint the murals in the Mexican Embassy in Washington, D.C.

In 1933 Cueva del Río began work on the Embassy frescos, with the themes: La Fiesta de las Flores y Frutas en Tehuantepec (Flowers and Fruits party in Tehuantepec), also called Fiesta Tehuana; Los Volcanes, Fraternidad Panamericana (The volcanoes and Pan-American fraternity). The fresco created great expectations in Mexico. "El Nacional" newspaper published a head note on June 19, 1934, about the visit of the artist back to Mexico. "Now is among us the great Mexican painter Roberto Cueva del Río" with a deeply exaltation, pointing that: "The fresco that he is creating in the embassy will be the biggest worldwide, due the walls around the central stair has a picture continuity and ideological solution from the floor to the ceiling. Cueva del Río makes next to José Clemente Orozco, Diego Rivera and David Alfaro Siqueiros, the quadrangle of the best paintbrush artists with real work outside of Mexico". In this mural we can see Carlos Fuentes in his youth.
 
1933, he was working in Palacio de Gobierno in Chilpancing, the capital of the state of Guerrero, Mexico.

In 1938 he returned to Mexico where he worked for President General Lázaro Cárdenas del Río on several projects including a Mayan themes frieze for the dining room of his private home in Jiquilpan, another large mural called Historia y Paisaje de Michoacán for the dining room of his house in Pátzcuaro named Casa Eréndira (today occupied by the CREFAL). He also completed two small panels on the traditional dance of the fish and the market in a viewpoint called Cerro Colorado or Estribo Chico in Pátzcuaro. Additionally he did frescos in an elementary school on the island of Yunuén in Lake Pátzcuaro. He also decorated the auditorium of the Teatro Emperador Caltzontzin during this period and painted a fresco in the foyer on the second floor.

In 1941 he did a series of eight oil paintings for a Gallery of Michoacan Heroes. These were place in the reception hall of the Governor's Palace (Palacio de Gobierno) Morelia City, Michoacán. One of these has been lost, but the other seven 

In 1942 he was designated Director of the Fine Arts School in Morelia.

In 1944 he decorated the mail congress hall with a mural ”Congreso de Apatzingán.”

In 1945 he was commissioned for personal portraits and created political magazine covers.

In 1952 he painted a mural about the Conquest of Mexico, in the Palacio de Gobierno in Chilpancingo, Guerrero.

In 1955 he did murals in Valle del Mezquital.

In 1956 in the former San Francisco Convent Museum.

In 1957 Guerrero's Revolution history, in the Palacio de Gobierno in Chilpancingo City, Guerrero.

In 1962 he performed the hall of the ex government palace Murals.

In 1963 Morelos portrait for the Deputies Chamber at Cortés Palace in Cuernavaca, in Morelos.

In 1964, he performed two murals with Ayala's Plan Theme; General Alvarez protest in Cuernavaca. One of the murals was at Casino de la Selva Hotel and the other one at Cuernavaca city hall.

In 1966 He performed a big portrait of Hidalgo Liberator, at the Senate of Mexico City.

In 1967 he made Illustrations about the history of the Mexico Conquest (they were made for a history of Mexico book)

In 1968 five portraits of important Mexican doctors to decorate  the halls of the psychiatric hospital in Mexico City.
In the same year he taught watercolor, drawing and composition classes at the Architecture School at University of Mexico.
Mural at Government Palace Hall in Acapulco, Guerrero.

In 1973 he decorated the Acapulco municipal palace with six large murals about the history and customs of the Mexican port.

In 1976 he made a folding screen of 5.00 m x 2.00 m with the Conquest of Mexico theme, where it is exposed the two cultures encounter and the fusion of the Mexican Indian culture and European races, and the result of these until our days.

In 1980 he traveled to Europe and did several watercolors in Spain, France, Italy and some more places.

In 1985 did easel painting in watercolor, oil and acrylic in the states of Morelos, Guerrero, Mexico, and Puebla and some other places in Mexico.

A whole life rich of art, he performed murals and easel painting. Painted portraits for politics, presidents of the Mexican republic as well as theirs wives; also governors, industrialists, artists, national heroes, cartoons, customs themes, landscapes, portraits and some many more themes. All a life dedicated to pictoric art. Unfortunately much of his work could not been found, it is made a great effort to join the most possible through their collections, also the National University of Mexico, The National Institute of Anthropology and History and the Institute of Fine Arts are very interested in reunite the most of the work  for being shown.

He died in 1988 at the age of 80 years from an accident in his house, but he was quite sick at the time.

References 

1908 births
1988 deaths
Artists from Puebla
People from Puebla (city)
Mexican muralists
Accidental deaths in Mexico